Fillmore West '71 is a four-CD live album by the Allman Brothers Band.  It was recorded January 29January 31, 1971, at the Fillmore West in San Francisco.  It was released on September 6, 2019.

At these three concerts at Bill Graham's Fillmore West, the Allman Brothers were the middle of three acts, following the Trinidad Tripoli Steel Band and preceding top-billed Hot Tuna.  The album contains the ABB's complete performances from these shows.  It also includes a bonus track of a lengthy "Mountain Jam" recorded about ten months earlier  at the Warehouse in New Orleans, which is notable for being the longest recorded version of the song at 45 minutes.

Critical reception 
On AllMusic, Thom Jurek said, "A revelation of these recordings is what they say about the Allmans' development and how much more polished they were just six weeks later [on At Fillmore East], which doesn't diminish the earlier dates one iota: These performances are absolutely electrifying. They are wooly and intensely exploratory.... Despite the minor flaws in the sound on some of this, Allman Brothers Band fans will find these kinetic performances essential, and likely even revelatory."

In the Sarasota Herald-Tribune, Wade Tatangelo wrote, "While the sound quality at times borderlines on good bootleg quality, Fillmore West '71 should be a welcome addition to Allman Brothers fans, especially ones interested in soaking up the output of the original lineup... In 1971, there wasn't a rock band on the planet offering a synthesis of rock, blues, jazz and country quite like the Allman Brothers. Touring in support of their second studio album, Idlewild South, the band had perfected a killer live show consisting of epic originals and innovative covers, all given to fresh improvisation on a nightly basis."

Track listing 
Disc 1
January 29, 1971
"Statesboro Blues" (Will McTell) – 4:20
"Trouble No More" (McKinley Morganfield) – 4:10
"Don't Keep Me Wonderin'" (Gregg Allman) – 3:27
"In Memory of Elizabeth Reed" (Dickey Betts) – 14:28
"Midnight Rider" (G. Allman, Robert Payne) – 3:14
"Dreams" (G. Allman) – 11:37
"You Don't Love Me" (Willie Cobbs) – 16:49
"Whipping Post" (G. Allman) – 18:50

Disc 2
January 30, 1971
"Statesboro Blues" (McTell) – 4:18
"Trouble No More" (Morganfield) – 3:57
"Don't Keep Me Wonderin'" (G. Allman) – 3:50
"In Memory of Elizabeth Reed" (Betts) – 11:46
"Stormy Monday" (T-Bone Walker) – 9:04
"You Don't Love Me" (Cobbs) – 16:21
"Whipping Post" (G. Allman) – 16:01

Disc 3
January 31, 1971
"Statesboro Blues" (McTell) – 4:29
"Trouble No More" (Morganfield) – 4:05
"Don't Keep Me Wonderin'" (G. Allman) – 3:41
"In Memory of Elizabeth Reed" (Betts) – 12:27
"Midnight Rider" (G. Allman, Payne) – 3:05
"Hoochie Coochie Man" (Willie Dixon) – 4:55
"Dreams" (G. Allman) – 10:49
"You Don't Love Me" (Cobbs) – 17:10

Disc 4
January 31, 1971, continued
"Hot 'Lanta" (G. Allman, Duane Allman, Betts, Berry Oakley, Butch Trucks, Jai Johanny Johanson) – 5:31
"Whipping Post" (G. Allman) – 20:53
March 13, 1970 – The Warehouse, New Orleans
"Mountain Jam" (Donovan Leitch, G. Allman, D. Allman, Betts, Oakley, Trucks, Johanson) – 45:42

Personnel 
The Allman Brothers Band
Duane Allman – lead and slide guitars
Gregg Allman – Hammond B-3 organ, vocals
Dickey Betts – lead guitar
Berry Oakley – bass, vocals on "Hoochie Coochie Man"
Jaimoe – drums, percussion
Butch Trucks – drums, tympani
Production
Executive producer: Bert Holman
Project supervision: Kirk West, John Lynskey, Bill Levenson
Mastering: Tom Lewis
Package design – Terry Bradley
Photography – Jim Marshall
Liner notes: John Lynskey

References 

The Allman Brothers Band live albums
2019 live albums